OGDC may refer to:

 Oil and Gas Development Company Limited of Pakistan
 Oxoglutarate dehydrogenase complex, an enzyme complex